Raman (Jawi: رمان ) is a district (amphoe) in the northeastern part of Yala province, southern Thailand.

History

The name Raman is a Thai corruption of Reman (Jawi: رمان), its original Malay name. Mueang Raman was one of seven kingdoms, into which the Sultanate of Patani was split at the beginning of the 19th century to reduce the power of the Sultan of Patani after a series of rebellions against the Siamese rule. Tuan Mansor was appointed the first ruler and resided in Kota Baru.

In 1917 the district was renamed from Raman to Kota Baru, the seat of administration. In 1938 it was given back its historic name.

Seven sub-districts are scheduled to be split off to form the new district Kota Baru in 2015.

Geography
Neighboring districts are (from the north clockwise): Yarang, Thung Yang Daeng, and Kapho of Pattani province; Bacho and Rueso of Narathiwat province; and Bannang Sata, Krong Pinang, and Mueang Yala of Yala Province.

Administration

Central administration 
Raman is divided into 16 sub-districts (tambons), which are further subdivided into 90 administrative villages (mubans).

Local administration 
There are three sub-district municipalities (thesaban tambon) in the district:
 Mueang Raman consisting of parts of sub-district Kayu Boko.
 Kota Baru consisting of sub-district Kota Baru.
 Balo consisting of sub-district Balo.

There are 14 subdistrict administrative organizations (SAO) in the district:
 Kayu Boko consisting of parts of sub-district Kayu Boko.
 Kalupang consisting of sub-district Kalupang.
 Kalo consisting of sub-district Kalo.
 Koto Tuera consisting of sub-district Koto Tuera.
 Kero consisting of sub-district Kero.
 Cha-kwa consisting of sub-district Cha-kwa.
 Tha Thong consisting of sub-district Tha Thong.
 Noen Ngam consisting of sub-district Noen Ngam.
 Ba-ngoi consisting of sub-district Ba-ngoi.
 Buemang consisting of sub-district Buemang.
 Yata consisting of sub-district Yata.
 Wang Phaya consisting of sub-district Wang Phaya.
 A-song consisting of sub-district A-song.
 Talo Halo consisting of sub-district Talo Halo.

References

External links
amphoe.com (Thai)

Districts of Yala province